Somnes may refer to:

George Somnes (1887–1956), American theatre and film director
Johan Sömnes, Swedish actor in Let the Right One In
Sømnes, Norway, a Norwegian coastal village in Nord-Trøndelag